The 1992–93 Israel State Cup (Gvia HaMedina) was the 54th season of Israel's nationwide football cup competition and the 39th after the Israeli Declaration of Independence.

The competition was won by Maccabi Haifa who had beaten Maccabi Tel Aviv 1–0 in the final.

By winning, Maccabi Haifa qualified to the 1993–94 European Cup Winners' Cup, entering in the qualifying round.

Format Changes
The competition reverted to being played as one-legged ties for each round, with the ties being settled in one match, including extra time and penalties.

Results

Eighth Round

Byes: Hapoel Ashdod, Hapoel Tirat HaCarmel, Hapoel Yehud, Maccabi Afula.

Round of 16

Quarter-finals

Semi-finals

Final

References
100 Years of Football 1906–2006, Elisha Shohat (Israel), 2006, p. 289
Maccabi Tel Aviv – Maccabi Haifa, State Cup Final 1992-1993 youtube.com
Israel 1992/93 RSSSF

Israel State Cup
State Cup
Israel State Cup seasons